Stemod-13(17)-ene synthase (EC 4.2.3.34, OsKSL11, stemodene synthase) is an enzyme with systematic name 9α-copalyl-diphosphate diphosphate-lyase (stemod-13(17)-ene-forming). This enzyme catalyses the following chemical reaction

 9alpha-copalyl diphosphate  stemod-13(17)-ene + diphosphate

This enzyme takes part in the biosynthesis of the stemodane family of diterpenoid secondary metabolites.

References

External links 
 

EC 4.2.3